Nicole Muskatewitz (born 6 August 1994) is a German curler.

At the national level, she is a two-time German women's champion (2013, 2014).

At the international level, she is a 2012 Winter Youth Olympics mixed doubles curling champion alongside Swiss curler Michael Brunner.

Teams

Women's

Mixed

Mixed doubles

References

External links

 

Living people
1994 births
German female curlers
German curling champions
Competitors at the 2017 Winter Universiade
Curlers at the 2012 Winter Youth Olympics